Shane Raymond Marshall AM is a former judge of the Federal Court of Australia and a current acting judge of the Supreme Court of Tasmania and a deputy chairperson of the Victorian Racing Tribunal.

Marshall graduated with degrees in economics (1977) and law (hons)(1979) at Monash University. After graduating, he practised as an articled law clerk and solicitor, from February 1979 to August 1981, at Maurice Blackburn and Co., in its industrial law section, before being admitted to the Victorian Bar in November 1981, where he predominantly practised in industrial and employment law He attended St.Bede's College Mentone where he was Dux of Humanities in 1973. In 2008 he was inducted into the St.Bede's Hall of Fame.

Marshall was appointed as a judge of the Federal Court of Australia on 17 July 1995, and concurrently as a judge of the Industrial Relations Court of Australia (later merged into the Federal Court). He retired on 21 November 2015. Between 2004 and 2013, he was also an additional judge of the Supreme Court of the Australian Capital Territory.In that court he presided over judge alone trials and jury trials and civil actions as well as sitting on full court appeals in civil and criminal matters.

In 2003, Marshall was recognised with a Centenary Medal for services to industrial relations. From 2005 to 2011 he was an associate member of the Judicial System Monitoring Program in East Timor and wrote several articles on the justice system in East Timor. Between 2002 and 2011 his work in East Timor included giving seminars on labor law to district court judges, participating in a program designed to connect the official justice system to systems of community justice in villages and organising the law and justice section of development conferences in Dili.  He was a member of the board of the law faculty at Monash University between 2008 and 2013, and a member of its advisory committee from 2013 to 2015.In 2015 he was appointed the inaugural Patron of the South East Monash Legal Service and continues in that role. Since 2014 Marshall has been a member of the advisory board of the Australian Intercultural Society. He was a trustee of the Caulfield Racecourse Reserve Trust from 2003 to 2017. From 2016 to 2019 he was chairman of Greyhound Racing Victoria Racing Appeals and Disciplinary Board. Since January 2017 he has been an acting judge of the Supreme Court of Tasmania, sitting at first instance in civil and criminal matters and on the full court in civil matters as well as on the Court of Criminal Appeal. From 2017 to June 2021 he was a judge of the Supreme Court of Nauru for refugee appeals. From August 2019 he has been a deputy chairperson of the Victorian Racing Tribunal. Since 2016 he has been a lawyer member of the Councillor Conduct Panel under the Victorian Local Government Act.On 18 March 2021 he was appointed to the arbiter panel list under s142(3)(a) of the Local Government Act (Vic) 2020. He is a legends member of the Collingwood Football Club, a full member of the Melbourne Cricket Club and a full member of the Victoria Racing Club. He was an inugurual director of and an ambassador for the Wellbeing and the Law Foundation. He has been a volunteer speaker for Beyond Blue. In June 2020 he was awarded an AM for services to industrial relations, the law, the judiciary and mental health.  

In February 2015 Marshall spoke publicly about his battle with depression, and similar difficulties experienced by members of the legal profession. He has delivered several addresses to law societies, bar associations, law firms, defence force legal personnel, rural rotary clubs and courts in Australia and New Zealand about depression generally and depression and the law. On 20 June 2022 the Victorian premier announced that he was to be appointed to chair an independent review panel to examine compulsory treatment criteria and alignment of decision making laws under Victorian mental health and wellbeing legislation.That appointment was formally made by the Acting Minister for Mental Health on 26 October 2022.

He is married with two daughters and identical twin granddaughters.

References

Judges of the Federal Court of Australia
Judges of the Supreme Court of the Australian Capital Territory
Monash University alumni
Living people
Judges of the Industrial Relations Court of Australia
20th-century Australian judges
21st-century Australian judges
Year of birth missing (living people)
Members of the Order of Australia
Monash Law School alumni